Major-General George Warren Richards  (1898–1978) was a British Army officer.

Military career
After graduating from the Royal Military College, Sandhurst, Richards was commissioned into the Royal Welch Fusiliers on 16 August 1916. Attached tp the Machine Gun Corps, he saw action at the Battle of Aleppo in October 1918 in the Middle Eastern theatre of the First World War. In 1918 he was awarded the Military Cross.

Remaining in the army during the interwar period, he transferred to the Royal Tank Corps (later the Royal Tank Regiment) in 1920 and was adjutant of the 4th Battalion, RTC in 1928. He married two years later. He attended the Staff College, Camberley from 1934 to 1935 and was then a senior instructor at the Tank School, Bovington, from 1939 to 1940.

He became commanding officer of the 49th Royal Tank Regiment at Catterick Garrison in Yorkshire in August 1940. In early 1941 he was sent to North Africa where he served as a staff officer with the 7th Armoured Division during Operations 'Battleaxe' and 'Crusader'. He was then promoted to Brigadier and given command of 4th Armoured Brigade in December 1941, and saw action at the Battle of Gazala in May 1942. He then became Commander of the 1st Army Tank Brigade in July 1942 and took part in the First Battle of Alamein later that month. After that he became commander of 23rd Armoured Brigade in August 1942 and commanded his brigade at the Second Battle of El Alamein in October 1942. He then became Major-General Royal Armoured Corps for 21st Army Group in 1944 and took part in the Normandy landings and the advance into North West Europe.

After the war he became General Officer Commanding the 53rd (Welsh) Infantry Division in June 1946 and General Officer Commanding 49th (West Riding) Armoured Division in January 1947 before retiring in December 1948.

He retired to Abergavenny and was a deputy lieutenant for Monmouthshire in 1965.

References

Bibliography

External links
Generals of World War II
Imperial War Museum Interview

|-

1898 births
1978 deaths
British Army major generals
Deputy Lieutenants of Monmouthshire
Royal Tank Regiment officers
Machine Gun Corps officers
Graduates of the Royal Military College, Sandhurst
British Army generals of World War II
Companions of the Order of the Bath
Commanders of the Order of the British Empire
Companions of the Distinguished Service Order
Recipients of the Military Cross
Royal Welch Fusiliers officers
British Army personnel of World War I
Graduates of the Staff College, Camberley